Kralevo is a village in Stambolovo Municipality, in Haskovo Province, in southern Bulgaria.

References

Villages in Stambolovo Municipality